The Tower of Finochjarola is a ruined Genoese tower in Corsica, located on the island of Finacchiarola, in the commune of Rogliano (Haute-Corse). The Finacchiarola Islands are designated as a nature reserve.

The tower was one of a series of coastal defences constructed by the Republic of Genoa between 1530 and 1620 to stem the attacks by Barbary pirates.

See also
List of Genoese towers in Corsica

Notes and references

Towers in Corsica